Side Street is a 1950 American film noir/police procedural starring Farley Granger and Cathy O'Donnell. Directed by Anthony Mann, the picture was filmed on location throughout New York City and culminated in one of the first modern car chases. Part of the story is set in the vicinity of the long-demolished Third Avenue El, a favorite location of the films made in the city during that era.

Granger and O’Donnell were paired for the second and last time; their earlier film was the noted noir They Live By Night (1948).

Plot
Joe Norson lives with his wife and her parents in New York City; he has lost his gas station job and found work as a part-time mail carrier. Because he wants the best for his expectant wife Ellen, Joe rationalizes stealing what he thinks is $200 from a lawyer's office on his route. He discovers that he's actually stolen $30,000 from Victor Backett, a corrupt attorney. Backett has framed wealthy broker/patsy Emil Lorrison in a sex scandal, then extorted the money from him with the help of Lucille "Lucky" Colner and ex-con and accomplice Georgie Garsell.

From the start, Joe begins to panic. He explains his newfound wealth to Ellen as a lucrative out-of-town job, then disguises the money as a package and leaves it with bartender Nick Drumman. In the meantime, Lucille's body is found in the East River, strangled, and Captain Walter Anderson of the New York Police Department investigates the murder. Both Lorrison and Backett are interviewed, their names having been found in Lucille's "love diary." After the birth of his child, Joe decides to try to return his ill-gotten gain, but Backett suspects a trap and refuses the offer. Backett instead sends Garsell and a taxi driver to grab Joe and recover the cash. Joe is able to escape after they discover that Drumman has substituted a nightgown in the package and gone into hiding with the money.

Joe looks for Drumman, but Garsell finds the bartender first, strangles him, and recovers the money. Joe confesses the original theft to Ellen, who urges him to turn himself in, but he finds himself a suspect in Drumman's murder. He tries to track down the source of the money to clear himself, even as Captain Anderson methodically pursues both men as suspects—Garsell for Lucille and Joe for Drumman. Joe locates Garsell's girlfriend, singer Harriet Sinton (Jean Hagen), but she betrays him to Garsell. Garsell plans to murder Joe and strangles Harriet to eliminate her as a witness. Captain Anderson is hot on their heels and a chase ensues through the early morning streets of New York. Garsell's partner, the taxi driver, tries to surrender to the police, so Garsell shoots him and forces Joe to drive. Joe deliberately crashes the taxi to end the nightmare. Garsell climbs out of the wreckage and dies in an exchange of gunfire with the police. Ellen arrives, and finds Joe seriously but not mortally injured; she embraces him before the police load him into an ambulance.

Cast
 Farley Granger as Joe Norson
 Cathy O'Donnell as Ellen Norson
 James Craig as Georgie Garsell
 Paul Kelly as Captain Walter Anderson
 Jean Hagen as Harriet Sinton
 Paul Harvey as Emil Lorrison
 Edmon Ryan as Victor Backett
 Charles McGraw as Stanley Simon, detective
 Edwin Max as Nick Drumman
 Adele Jergens as Lucille "Lucky" Colner
 Harry Bellaver as Larry Giff, cab driver
 Whit Bissell as Harold Simpsen, chief teller
 John Gallaudet as Gus Heldon, bar owner
 Esther Somers as Mrs. Malby, Ellen's mother
 Harry Antrim as Mr. Malby, Ellen's father
 Ben Cooper as the young man at the dry cleaner
 King Donovan as Detective Gottschalk
 David Bauer as Smitty, the cab driver
 Anthony Dexter as Radio Clerk (uncredited)
 Herb Vigran as Photographer (uncredited)

Reception
According to MGM records, the film made $448,000 in the U.S. and Canada and $323,000 elsewhere, resulting in a loss to the studio of $467,000.

Critical response
When the film was screened in New York City in 2006 as part of Film Forum's festival devoted to the "B Noir" films of the 1940s and 1950s, film critic Ed Gonzalez for Slant magazine, reviewed the film and found he liked the picture's mise en scène and screenplay, writing "Side Street is a triumph of visual savvy and moral exactitude—-a scurrying spectacle of dog-cat-and-mouse throughout the veiny streets of New York City. The Big Apple comes alive via a nervy mix of photojournalistic shots of people on the move and hieratic [formal] compositions that give the squeeze to Farley Granger's Joe Norson..."

Critic Nathan Gelgud wrote in 2007 "Because it's an Anthony Mann movie, Side Street is similarly interested in detail, as well as great action sequences and even greater locations. The best stuff is inside a bar where Farley Granger leaves a bundle of stolen money. The scenes in the bar are the ones that come immediately to mind when you think of Side Street because the details are spot-on, and Mann constructs the place with the depth of the academy frame he’s so good at utilizing."

References

External links
 
 
 
 
 Side Street information site and DVD review at DVD Beaver (includes images)
 

1940s crime thriller films
American crime thriller films
American black-and-white films
Film noir
Films directed by Anthony Mann
Films scored by Lennie Hayton
Films set in New York City
Films shot in New York City
Metro-Goldwyn-Mayer films
1940s English-language films
1940s American films